Ábner Elí Méndez Peña (born 1 August 1988 in Puerto Cortés, Honduras) is a Honduran footballer who currently plays for 
Atlético Choloma in the Honduran National League.

Club career
Méndez played for several clubs before moving to F.C. Motagua in May 2012. A right-sided midfielder he joined the Motagua injury list in August 2012 with an ankle injury. He then joined Atlético Choloma for the 2013 Clausura.

International career
On 11 October 2011, Méndez made his international debut for Honduras, coming in as substitute for Julio César de León in the 88th minute in a friendly match against Jamaica.

Statistics

Club statistics

References

External links
 Profile - FENAFUTH

1988 births
Living people
People from Puerto Cortés
Association football midfielders
Honduran footballers
Honduras international footballers
Platense F.C. players
Hispano players
C.D. Olimpia players
C.D.S. Vida players
F.C. Motagua players
Atlético Choloma players
Liga Nacional de Fútbol Profesional de Honduras players